K. Prakash Babu (born 14 May 1955) is an Indian communist politician. He represented Pathanapuram constituency in the Kerala Legislative Assembly from 1991 to 2001. He was Headmaster of Manjakkala U.P. school. In 2012, he was elected the Assistant Secretary of Communist Party of India Kerala State Council.

Positions Held
Chairman, Committee on Subordinate Legislation (1996-98)  & (1998-01)
Member, C.P.I. State Council
Member CPI District Council
Member Kerala University Senate
President, All India Kisan Sabha, Kerala State Council
AIYF Kollam District
Headmaster, Manjakkala U.P.S.

References

1955 births
Living people
Communist Party of India politicians from Kerala